Koulpélogo is one of the 45 provinces of Burkina Faso, located in its Centre-Est Region. The population in 2019 was 361,586.

Its capital is Ouargaye.

Departments
Koulpelogo is divided into 8 departments:

See also
Regions of Burkina Faso
Provinces of Burkina Faso
Departments of Burkina Faso

References

 
Provinces of Burkina Faso